KBDZ (93.1 FM) is a radio station broadcasting a Classic Rock format.  Licensed to Perryville, Missouri, United States, the station is owned by Donze Communications and features programming from Westwood One.

The station features shows such as longtime Missouri and Illinois radio personality JC Corcoran’s “The Morning Showgram”; “Zav and the Classic Rock Cafe”, hosted by Chris Razavi; “Kevy Kev and Nitewatch”; Carl Russo; Dan Mitchell; “JD and Bridget”.

History

The station went on the air as KRAA on November 29, 1989.  On September 21, 1990, the station changed its call sign to KBDZ.

When the station first went on the air, KBDZ was playing Soft Rock hits but that changed after the Flood of 1993 when station owners dropped the soft rock format and switched to "Mainstream Country" after sister station KSGM AM 980 went dark because of the damage to the transmitter site located in the bottoms of Perry County, MO.

The local news and sports programming was also switched to KBDZ. In addition the station became the local affiliate for St. Louis Cardinals baseball and St. Louis Blues hockey.

Prior to a change in format, KBDZ was given permission to upgrade the signal with the construction of a radio tower in Weingarten, MO. The construction permit allowed KBDZ to increase the effective radiated power from 6,000 watts to 50,000 watts. An additional change to 36,000 watts at a larger height above average terrain was later approved.

However with the upgrade, the station was forced to move Cardinal baseball to sister station KSGM AM 980 because of the signal's penetration into the St. Louis market and overlap with Cardinal flagship station KMOX. KSGM AM would eventually drop St. Louis Blues hockey but added Blues Hockey back to their sports lineup in October 2019.

Then, in November 2013, KBDZ switched from "B931 Country" to "Classic Rock 93.1".

On February 15, 2016, longtime St. Louis radio personality JC Corcoran debuted on KBDZ during the morning drive time slot. However on June 8, 2021, KBDZ announced through its official Facebook that Donze Communications and JC Corcoran were parting ways, due to a variety of reasons they announced were staying private but was in relation to Corcoran “inaccurately and unfairly attacking personnel”.

References

External links
Classic Rock 93.1 Facebook

BDZ